Adolfsbergs IK is a Swedish football club located in Örebro in Örebro County.

Background
Adolfsbergs Idrottsklubb is a sports club from the district of Adolfsberg in Örebro. The club was founded on 8 November 1943 and was first involved in bandy and table tennis. From 1944 football was played at the Brunnsparken and since 1957 at the Lugnets IP in Sommarroskogen where there is also a clubhouse.

Since 1975 the club has only specialised in football. Adolfsbergs IK currently has 450 active players and around 20 teams. Along with BK Forward and Karlslunds IF HFK, Adolfsbergs IK arranges one of Sweden's largest youth tournaments, the Örebro Cup.

Since their foundation Adolfsbergs IK has participated mainly in the middle and lower divisions of the Swedish football league system. In 2010 the club played in Division 3 Västra Svealand, which is the fifth tier of Swedish football, but they finished in a relegation position and in 2011 they will play in Division 4 Örebro Län. They play their home matches at the Lugnets IP in Örebro.

Adolfsbergs IK are affiliated to the Örebro Läns Fotbollförbund.

Season to season

Attendances

In recent seasons Adolfsbergs IK have had the following average attendances:

Footnotes

External links
 Adolfsbergs IK – Official website

Sport in Örebro
Football clubs in Örebro County
Sports clubs established in 1943
Association football clubs established in 1943
Bandy clubs established in 1943
1943 establishments in Sweden
Defunct bandy clubs in Sweden